Diary of a Wimpy Kid: The Third Wheel is a 2012 bestselling children's novel and the seventh book in the [[Diary of a Wimpy Kid (book series)|Diary of a Wimpy Kid]] series, written by American author Jeff Kinney. Kinney announced the book in March 2012, with The Third Wheels cover revealed in May 2012. The book was released on November 13, 2012.

Plot
Greg recalls several anecdotes from the time of his conception to his preschool years, notable ones include how his mother read to him before bed, how his parents’ excessive kissing supposedly led to his premature birth, and his difficulties in learning how to walk. After talking about what his life was like from before he was born to his preschool years, Greg explains some of the new parenting methods his mother has tried on Manny and how Manny has been affected by those methods, which differ from those of Greg's.

After comparing his childhood to that of Manny's, Greg decides to do chores when his Uncle Gary shows up at the front door. Uncle Gary explains how he was tricked into a “business opportunity of a lifetime” and needs a place to stay while getting back up onto his feet. He moves in before Greg's father can object to the proposition.

As Uncle Gary has difficulties adjusting to life at Greg's home the school prepares for a new student council election. Greg signs Rowley up to be a member due to his lack of detentions. Greg starts off a  desperately large, disorganized voting campaign for Rowley, which proves useless as Rowley was the only one who signed up to be social chairperson.
The student council decides on the next school fundraiser. One student decides that they should do a mixed motocross and wrestling event, but that turned into a Valentine's Day dance because the school didn't like the idea of motorized vehicles in the gym. Greg decides to attend, but has a difficult time finding a girl who would accompany him.
 
Then, a girl on the student council, Abigail Brown, is left alone after her boyfriend, Michael Sampson, has a family obligation. Greg persuades Rowley to ask Abigail to go with them as a group of friends, to which she agrees. Greg's idea is to use Rowley to get him a girlfriend, so he can go on a date with her. Before the dance, the group goes out to dinner, but Greg is bankrupted after he is forced to pay the bill.

At the dance, their night is ruined when senior citizens overrun their dance, claiming they reserved the dance area first, but they compromise things that ruin the theme, such as lights, no more music and a partition severing half the gym. Michael Sampson arrives with another girl, Cherie Bellanger, as the family obligation was a ruse and he didn't count on Abigail's attendance. Abigail is left in tears, and Greg attempts to comfort her. Finally, while dancing with Abigail, Greg spots what looks like chicken pox marks on her face. It only turns out she had pimples when she was crying over Michael, but Greg panics, leaving Abigail in tears, and Rowley comforts her.

The book ends with Uncle Gary winning $40,000 from the local lottery and pays Dad with the money, thus able to now move out of the house. Rowley and Abigail begin dating, and Greg gets the chicken pox.

Development
The title and cover of The Third Wheel were revealed in May 2012. The book had an initial printing of 6.5 million copies. Kinney commented that he enjoyed writing the book because "there’s so much humor to be mined in the world of middle school romance."

Reception

Critical and reader reception for The Third Wheel was positive, with the San Angelo Standard-Times'' calling the book "masterful."

References

Third Wheel
2012 American novels
Novels by Jeff Kinney
Amulet Books books
Puffin Books books
2012 children's books